Jennifer Thomas may refer to:
Jennifer Anne Thomas, British physicist
Jennifer Thomas (pianist) (born 1977), American pianist
Jennifer Thomas (wrestler) (born 1973), American wrestler